See Ferrari 375 F1 for the 375 used in Formula 1 racing, and 375 America, a GT car
The Ferrari 375 MM, was a sports racing car produced by Ferrari in 1953 up to 1955 for the road cars. It was named "375" for the unitary displacement of one cylinder in the 4.5 L V12 engine, and the "MM" stood for the Mille Miglia race. In total 26 units were made, including four converted from the 340 MM.

Development
The first prototype was a Vignale Spyder and three next cars were Pinin Farina Berlinettas, all converted from the Ferrari 340 MM. Majority of the cars would be bodied by Pinin Farina in a spider style.

The engine was based on its Ferrari 375 F1 counterpart, but with shorter stroke and bigger bore, for the customer cars and unchanged for the factory ones.

Perhaps the most known 375 MM is the Pininfarina "Bergman Coupé", s/n 0456AM, commissioned in 1954 by director Roberto Rossellini for his wife, actress Ingrid Bergman. Rossellini also owned another 375 MM spyder, s/n 0402AM, which sustained a crash and was rebodied into a coupe by Scaglietti. The Scaglietti coupe was subsequently bought by the Microsoft executive Jon Shirley and restored  by Ferrari specialist Butch Dennison. It would later become the first postwar Ferrari to win Best of Show at the Pebble Beach Concours d'Elegance.

The list of notable examples also includes a coupé created by Carrozzeria Ghia to a Giovanni Michelotti design. It was the last Ferrari ever to be bodied by this Turinese coachbuilder. The car was presented at the Torino Motor Show and the New York Auto Show, both in 1955.

Specifications

Engine
The 375 MM was available with two different engines, both of around 4.5 L capacity. One was for customer cars and the other for the factory teams. Factory race drivers received a straight derivative of the Formula One unit from the 375 F1. The new updated engine, codenamed as the tipo 108, was reserved for the customer cars. The engine had a changed capacity of 4522.68 cc, thanks to its  of bore and stroke, and would also be mounted in the 375 America road car. Both versions used three Weber 40IF/4C or 42DCZ carburettors and could produce  at 7000 rpm.

Chassis and suspension
The chassis was of a tipo 102 designation and was derived from its predecessor, the 340 MM, also made out of welded steel tubes. The suspension setup was also inherited from the 340 MM, but with an addition of the Houdaille-type hydraulic shock absorbers in the front and rear.

Racing

Although intended for the Mille Miglia, the 375 MM was also raced with limited success in the Carrera Panamericana, scoring fourth place in 1953 and finishing second in 1954. Other major successes in 1953 included overall wins at Spa 24 Hours, driven by Giuseppe Farina and Mike Hawthorn duo, 12 Hours of Pescara with Hawthorn and Umberto Maglioli and 12 Hours of Casablanca, won by Farina and Piero Scotti. The 375 MM with Alberto Ascari and Luigi Villoresi, was contesting the 1953 24 Hours of Le Mans alongside its 4.1-litre siblings, to no avail due to a clutch problems. In the 1000 km Nürburgring race of 1953, the 375 MM scored another victory with Giuseppe Farina, this time aided by Alberto Ascari. This race along with Spa 24 Hours counted towards the 1953 World Sportscar Championship, won for Ferrari in due honour to the 375 MM.

In 1954 in Argentina, Giuseppe Farina with Umberto Maglioli won the 1000 km Buenos Aires, that was a championship race. On 760 km track of Coppa della Toscana, Piero Scotti won in the 375 MM ahead of Gordini. Later, the 375 MM competed in races in Europe, South and North Americas, winning many of them. The car did not score any more championship points as it was replaced by a bigger displacement derivative, the 375 Plus.

References

Bibliography

External links

Ferrari 375 MM: Ferrari History

375 MM
Sports racing cars
1950s cars
24 Hours of Le Mans race cars
Mille Miglia
Pininfarina